Henrique De Castro is a business executive who is currently a board director at Banco Santander S.A (BMAD: SAN),  Fiserv. Inc. (NASDAQ: FISV) and Target Corporation (NYSE: TGT). He was a board director of First Data Corporation (NYSE: FDC) from 2017 until its merger with Fiserv. Inc. and led Cantor Fitzgerald's venture capital arm, Cantor Ventures, for 4 years, ending March 2019. Previously he was chief operating officer at Yahoo!, and held several senior executive positions at Google, including president of partner business worldwide, where he was responsible for approximately a third of Google's revenues and president of media, mobile & platforms worldwide, where he built and scaled the business globally to over 50 countries.

Before Google, De Castro had senior executive roles at Dell and McKinsey & Company. He is recognized across the globe for his extensive experience in the technology, internet, media, retail, fintech and consumer industries.

Education
De Castro received a Bachelor of Arts and a Master of Science from the Instituto Superior de Gestão in  Lisbon, Portugal, which he attended from 1985 to 1990. He received a Master of Business Administration degree from the International Institute for Management Development in Lausanne, Switzerland  He is fluent in English, Italian, French, Spanish, and Portuguese.

Career
De Castro is a native of Portugal. He began his career at Asea Brown Boveri (ABB) in corporate project finance and private equity.

De Castro later served as a consultant at McKinsey & Company.  He was also the Sales & Business Development Director for Dell Western Europe Region, where he managed sales and operations across nine countries.

Google

De Castro was director of sales and business development at Dell from 2004 to 2006. He joined Google in July 2006, managing media, sales and platforms for EMEA (Europe, Middle East and Africa). In April 2009, he became director and later vice-president and president of Google's media, mobile and platforms organization, with responsibility for $5 billion in annual business, including TV Ads, YouTube Ads, Google Display Network, Mobile Ads, AdMob, AdExchange and DoubleClick. He led the team to launch operations in 50+ countries, hired over 1,000 people, and acquired and integrated Google's two largest acquisitions.

From March to November 2012, De Castro was president of Google's worldwide Partner Business Solutions group, where he was responsible for advertising platforms and services for Google's publisher and commerce partners.

Yahoo Inc.
De Castro was appointed chief operating officer of Yahoo in November 2012 by its new CEO Marissa Mayer. He was Mayer's "first major hire to be her No. 2" and was the highest paid COO in the country.

As COO, de Castro was responsible for strategic and operational management of Yahoo's sales, media, business development and operations worldwide, with an annual budget of $5 billion.

Board memberships
In February 2019 De Castro was publicly announced as a newly elected board of directors member by Banco Santander S.A., a component of the Euro Stoxx 50 Market Index and one of the 20 largest banks in the World.
In July 2017 De Castro was elected to the board of directors of First Data Corporation, the global leader in payment solutions serving over 6 million merchants.
De Castro was elected to the board of directors of Minneapolis-based retailer Target Corporation in March 2013, a position he currently holds.[12] 
De Castro was a board director of the Interactive Advertising Bureau (IAB), an industry association that comprises 500+ leading media and technology companies, and sets the agenda to educate marketers, agencies, media companies and regulators on Interactive Advertising.

References

Living people
Date of birth missing (living people)
1960s births
Yahoo! employees
American chief operating officers
Google employees
Target Corporation people
Portuguese business executives
Portuguese corporate directors
McKinsey & Company people
University of Lisbon alumni
21st-century American businesspeople
21st-century Portuguese businesspeople
Members of the Board of Directors of the Banco Santander